The 1997 Winter Universiade, the XVIII Winter Universiade, took place in Muju and Chonju (Jeonju), South Korea. The snow sport events were held in Muju Resort in Muju, while the ice events were held in Chonju.

On 6 July 1993 during the 1993 Summer Universiade in Buffalo, FISU decided that South Korea would host the 1997 Winter Universiade. These were both the first winter multi-sport event and Universiade held in South Korea.

Logo
The two laughing profiles in a U-shape are inspired by a 'U', the first letter of the Universiade and intended to give out a soft and tender image.
The colors of blue and red, the two theme colors of the Korean national flag, Taeguk' ki, symbolizes the goal of the Winter Universiade '97-bringing harmony among university students from every corner of the globe through a sports festival.
The red circle at the upper right corner of the emblem is the symbol and dream of youth for a brighter and more peaceful future.

Mascot 
The official mascot of the 1997 Winter Universiade is Mudori (무돌이), a squirrel. Its name is derived from the main host county, Muju.

Venues

Muju 
 Muju Resort – Alpine skiing
 Ski jumping venue – Ski jumping, Nordic combined, opening and closing ceremonies
 Cross-country skiing and biathlon venue (currently golf courses) – Cross-country skiing, biathlon and Nordic combined

Chonju (Jeonju) 
 Chonju Indoor Ice Rink #1 – Figure skating and short track speed skating
 Chonju Indoor Ice Rink #2 (currently Hwasan Gymnasium) – Ice hockey
 Chonju Stadium – Speed skating (on the temporary ice mat)

Medal table

Sports
 Apline skiing
 Figure skating
 Ski jumping

See also 
 1999 Asian Winter Games

References 

 

 
1997
U
U
U
Muju County
Sports competitions in Jeonju
Multi-sport events in South Korea
January 1997 sports events in Asia
February 1997 sports events in Asia
Winter sports competitions in South Korea